Salar Grande is a caldera in Chile.

The region originally contained various rocks with ages ranging from Neoproterozoic to Triassic. Starting with the Oligocene, the Central Volcanic Zone was active and gave rise to calderas, lava domes, pyroclastic cones and stratovolcanoes.

The Salar Grande caldera is located close to the border with Argentina, northeast of the Salar de Pedernales. As the caldera formed, some volcanoes collapsed into the depression. The formation of the caldera was influenced by the neighbouring Pedernales-Arizaro fault.

The caldera is the source of the Salar Grande ignimbrite, as well as the San Andrés ignimbrite that overlies the former. The ignimbrites erupted by Salar Grande crop out mainly east of the caldera. They are yellow, white and gray and embedded within Miocene basaltic andesite, andesite and dacite lavas. Ages range from 12.07 ± 0.6 - 9.8 ± 0.8 million years ago.

References

Sources 

 
 

Calderas of Chile
Miocene calderas